Los Angeles Union Station is the main railway station in Los Angeles, California, and the largest railroad passenger terminal in the Western United States. It opened in May 1939 as the Los Angeles Union Passenger Terminal, replacing La Grande Station and Central Station.

Approved in a controversial ballot measure in 1926 and built in the 1930s, it served to consolidate rail services from the Union Pacific, Santa Fe, and Southern Pacific Railroads into one terminal station. Conceived on a grand scale, Union Station became known as the "Last of the Great Railway Stations" built in the United States. The structure combines Art Deco, Mission Revival, and Streamline Moderne style. It was placed on the National Register of Historic Places in 1980.

Today, the station is a major transportation hub for Southern California, serving almost 110,000 passengers a day. It is by far the busiest train station in the Western United States; it is Amtrak's fifth-busiest station, and is the twelfth-busiest train station in North America.

Four of Amtrak's long-distance trains originate and terminate here: the Coast Starlight to Seattle, the Southwest Chief and Texas Eagle to Chicago, and the Sunset Limited to New Orleans. The state-supported Amtrak Pacific Surfliner regional trains run frequently to San Diego and also to Santa Barbara and San Luis Obispo. The station is the hub of the Metrolink commuter rail system and is a major transfer point for several Metro Rail subway and light rail lines. The Patsaouras Transit Plaza, on the east side of the station, serves dozens of bus lines operated by Metro and several other municipal carriers.

History 
In 1926, a measure was placed on the ballot giving Los Angeles voters the choice between the construction of a vast network of elevated railways or the construction of a Union station to consolidate the city's two mainline railroad stations (Central Station and La Grande Station). The election took on racial connotations and became a defining moment in the development of Los Angeles. One proposed location for Union Station was located in the heart of what was Los Angeles' original Chinatown. Reflecting the racial prejudice of the time, Los Angeles Times, a lead opponent of elevated railways, argued in editorials that Union Station would not be built in the "midst of Chinatown" but rather would "forever do away with Chinatown and its environs." The Times also attacked the elevated railways for blocking out the California sun and in general being antithetical to the ethos of Los Angeles.

Two questions were put to vote in 1926. First, the voters approved Union Station instead of elevated railways by 61.3 to 38.7 percent margin. Second, the electorate voted in favor of Los Angeles Plaza, not Chinatown, as the site of the new station, but by a much smaller 51.1 to 48.9 percent margin. However, largely due to the efforts of preservationist Christine Sterling and Los Angeles Times publisher Harry Chandler, Union Station would not replace the Plaza, but be built across the street in Chinatown, which was demolished for the project. During the construction process of Union Station, archaeological remains from the Tongva village of Yaanga were uncovered. Researcher Joan Brown summarized this in 1992:Previous archaeological studies conducted at and near Union Station indicate that buried intact prehistoric and historic deposits exist in-situ beneath and in the vicinity of Union Station. The extent of the archaeological deposits is unknown at this time. Union Station was constructed on three to twenty feet of fill dirt placed over the original Los Angeles Chinatown. Chinatown, in turn, had been built over the remains of an Indian village, tentatively identified as the village of Yangna.

The glamorous new $11 million station (in 1939 dollars) took over from La Grande Station which had suffered major damage in the 1933 Long Beach earthquake and Central Station, which had itself replaced the Arcade Depot in 1914.

Passenger service was provided by the Santa Fe, Southern Pacific, and Union Pacific, as well as local lines of the Pacific Electric Railway and Los Angeles Railway (LARy). The famed Super Chief luxury train carried Hollywood stars and others to Chicago and thence the East Coast. Union Station saw heavy use during World War II, but later saw declining patronage due to the growing popularity of air travel and automobiles.

In 1948, the Santa Fe's Super Chief lost its brakes coming into the station, smashed through a steel bumper and concrete wall, and stopped with one third of the front of the locomotive dangling over Aliso St. No one was killed or injured, but the engineer lost his job.

The station was designated as a Los Angeles Historic–Cultural Monument No. 101 on August 2, 1972, and placed on the National Register of Historic Places in 1980.

The first commuter rail service to Union Station was the short-lived CalTrain that began operating on October 18, 1982, between Los Angeles and Oxnard. The service faced economic and political problems from the start and was suspended in March 1983. The next attempt at commuter rail came in 1990 with the launch of the Amtrak-operated Orange County Commuter. The once-daily round-trip served stations between Los Angeles and San Juan Capistrano.

In December 1989, the Santa Fe Pacific Realty Co purchased Southern Pacific's shareholding in the station, followed in January 1990 by Union Pacific's 22% and Santa Fe's 34%.

Metrolink commuter rail service began on October 26, 1992, with Union Station as the terminus for the San Bernardino Line, the Santa Clarita Line (later renamed the Antelope Valley Line) and the Ventura County Line. In January 1993, Metro's Red Line subway began service to the station, followed by Metrolink's Riverside Line in June. The Orange County Commuter train was discontinued on March 28, 1994, and replaced by Metrolink's Orange County Line. In May 2002, Metrolink added additional service to stations in Orange and Riverside counties with the opening of the 91 Line.

Light rail service arrived at Union Station on July 26, 2003, when Metro's Gold Line began operating to Pasadena from tracks 1 and 2. The line was expanded south over US 101 in November 2009 with the opening of the Gold Line Eastside Extension.

In February 2011, the board of the Los Angeles County Metropolitan Transportation Authority (Metro) approved the purchase of Union Station from Prologis and Catellus Development (a descendant of the Santa Fe and Southern Pacific railroads) for $75 million. The deal was closed on April 14, 2011. Since taking over ownership of the station, Metro has focused on increasing services for passengers at the station. One of the most noticeable changes is the addition of several retail and dining businesses to the concourse.

Amtrak opened a Metropolitan Lounge at Union Station on September 23, 2013. The lounge is open to Amtrak passengers traveling in sleeping car accommodations as well as some Amtrak Guest Rewards members (Select Plus and Select Executive levels only). The lounge features a staffed ticket counter, complimentary refreshments, complimentary Wi-Fi, and a conference room. Passengers using the Metropolitan Lounge receive priority boarding.

Metro plans to install Bluetooth beacons in Union Station to enable sending text messages to travelers' smartphones.

On March 15, 2021, it was announced that the station would serve as a joint venue of the 93rd Academy Awards along with the Dolby Theatre due to the impact of the COVID-19 pandemic on cinema. The ceremony was criticized for limiting access to the station and its COVID-19 testing site due to security measures mandated by the Academy.

On October 19, 2022, Greyhound moved its primary Los Angeles station to the Patsaouras Transit Plaza at Union Station.

Architecture 

Union Station was partially designed by John and Donald Parkinson, the father-and-son architectural firm who had also designed Los Angeles City Hall and other landmark Los Angeles buildings. They were assisted by a group of supporting architects, including Jan van der Linden. The structure combines Art Deco, Mission Revival, and Streamline Moderne style, with architectural details such as eight-pointed stars, and even elements of Dutch Colonial Revival architecture (at the suggestion of the Dutch-born Jan von der Linden).

Enclosed garden patios are on either side of the waiting room, and passengers exiting the trains were originally directed through the southern garden. The lower parts of the interior walls are covered in travertine marble; the upper parts have an early form of acoustical tile. The floor in the large rooms is terra cotta with a central strip of inlaid marble (including travertine, somewhat unusual in floors since it is soft). The ceiling in the grand waiting room has the appearance of wood, but is actually made of steel.

It is closed to the public, but occasionally rented out for film shoots or special events. Public art has been added to the station including an aquarium with a wall featuring etchings of Gabrielino Indians and Latino settlers such as Pío Pico.

Inside the grand waiting room is the Traxx restaurant and bar, which is Art Deco-themed, reflecting the history and architectural grandeur of its home. The restaurant opened in the late 1990s, and became a "top draw" at Union Station, according to the Los Angeles Times. Traxx closed between May and September 2019 as ownership of the restaurant changed.

Attached to the main building to the south is the station restaurant designed by the famed Southwestern architect Mary Colter. It was the last of the "Harvey House" restaurants to be constructed as a part of a passenger terminal. The vast rectangular dining room has a rounded central counter, streamlined booths and spectacular inlaid cement tile floor reproduces the pattern of a Navajo blanket.

Colter also designed a sleek, Streamline Moderne cocktail lounge. The restaurant closed in 1967 and for decades remained largely empty, used only for the occasional film shoot or special event. In October 2018, following a four-year renovation process, the dining room re-opened as the "Imperial Western Beer Co.," a restaurant and bar with its own attached brewery, and the cocktail lounge re-opened as "The Streamliner," a smaller craft cocktail bar.

Even with its grand scale, Union Station is still considered small in comparison to other union stations.

Public art 
Although Union Station contains no distinct sculptures or artworks from its early years, Metro rail development in the 1990s funded the installation of a variety of notable public art murals and sculptural installations for the station's new subterranean lobbies, portals and subway platforms.  The following Union Station public artworks include murals, granite seating sculptures, electronic wall-mounted art, glass mosaics, and a river-themed sculptural installation incorporating found objects from the subway excavation and an aquarium of native sea life.
 L.A.: City of Angels (1993) by Cynthia Carlson
 Traveler (1993) by Terry Schoonhoven
 Union Chairs (1993) by Christopher Sproat
 La Sombra del Arroyo (1995) by East Los Streetscapers
 City of Dreams (1996) by Richard Wyatt Jr.
 River of History (1996) by May Sun
 Riverbench (1996) by May Sun and Paul Diez
 A-Train (1996) by Bill Bell
 Solar Shift: San Bernardino and Santa Monica (2006) by Roy Nicholson

Location 

Union Station is located in the northeastern corner of Downtown Los Angeles, on the property bounded by Alameda Street, Cesar Chavez Avenue, Vignes Street, and the Hollywood Freeway. It is across Alameda Street from L.A.'s historic Olvera Street and El Pueblo de Los Angeles State Historic Park. The historic Terminal Annex building is on the opposite side of the Chavez Avenue underpass. Chinatown and Civic Center are a short distance away.

The site of the Tongva village of Yaanga, which was "believed to have been the largest of the Tongva villages," was in the vicinity.

The Patsaouras Transit Plaza on the east side of Union Station hosts several connecting bus lines, including Metro Local, Metro Rapid and Metro Express lines, as well as downtown DASH shuttles, many municipal bus lines, FlyAway express bus service to Los Angeles International Airport, and University of Southern California campus shuttles. The Transit Plaza is named after Nick Patsaouras, former RTD board member and advocate for public transportation.

The Gateway Transit Center includes the station itself and the Patsaouras Transit Plaza, both of which were designed by Ehrenkrantz & Eckstut, along with the western terminus of the El Monte Busway, as well as Metro's headquarters building.

, Amtrak and Metrolink share 12 of Union Station's 14 outdoor tracks, with 94 trains departing on most weekdays (95 on Wednesday, 96 on Friday).

Services

Amtrak

Amtrak long-distance routes

Union Station is the western terminus for four of Amtrak's long-distance trains:
 Coast Starlight, to Seattle (daily, service began 1971)
 Southwest Chief, to Chicago (daily, service began 1939 as Super Chief, renamed Southwest Limited in 1974 and Southwest Chief in 1984)
 Sunset Limited, to New Orleans (tri-weekly, service began 1939)
 Texas Eagle, to Chicago (tri-weekly, service began 1982): Runs combined with the Sunset Limited to San Antonio, where the train is split.

Amtrak California regional routes
Amtrak California operates multiple-times-daily regional rail services to cities across the state:
 Pacific Surfliner, from San Diego to San Luis Obispo via Los Angeles (service began 1939 as San Diegan, renamed Pacific Surfliner in 2000): 13 daily round trips, most of which originate and terminate here; three run to Goleta and two run to San Luis Obispo.
 Connections to the San Joaquin to Oakland or Sacramento are provided through Amtrak Thruway Motorcoach services. (see below)

Metrolink 
The station is the hub for Metrolink and six of Metrolink's seven lines serve the station:
 Antelope Valley Line, to Lancaster (service began 1992)
 Riverside Line, to Riverside (service began 1993)
 Orange County Line, to Oceanside (service began 1990 as the Amtrak Orange County Commuter)
 San Bernardino Line, to San Bernardino (service began 1992)
 Ventura County Line, to Ventura (service began 1992)
 91/Perris Valley Line, to Perris (service began 2002)

Metro Rail 
Three Metro Rail lines (the B (Red), D (Purple), and L (Gold) Lines) serve the station with about 300 Metro Rail trains departing every weekday.

Metro B Line/Metro D Line

The Metro B and Metro D subway lines have their eastern terminus at Union Station and share two tracks below Union Station. There are two entrances to the platform: one is located inside Union Station's main concourse on the west side of the complex, near Alameda Street, and the other is located near the Patsaouras Transit Plaza on the east side of the complex.

Metro L Line
The Metro L Line (Gold) is a light rail line that passes through Union Station as it travels between Azusa and East Los Angeles. Trains use Tracks 1 and 2 of Union Station's 14 outdoor tracks. The platform is accessible via staircase and elevator from the main passenger tunnel. From the Gold line's opening on July 26, 2003, until the segment to East Los Angeles opened on November 15, 2009, this station was the southern terminus. The platform features an art installation, entitled Images of Commonality/Nature and Movement, created by Beth Thielen.

The platform station will be served by the A Line, which will run from Long Beach to Azusa, once the Regional Connector is complete in 2023.

Metro Busway

Metro J Line

One Metro Busway bus rapid transit line makes a stop at the Patsaouras Transit Plaza. The Metro J Line operates between El Monte Bus Station, Downtown Los Angeles, Harbor Gateway Transit Center and select trips to San Pedro using the El Monte Busway and Harbor Transitway.

Bus and coach services

Long-distance motorcoach

Amtrak Thruway Motorcoach

Amtrak California operates several motorcoach routes under the Amtrak Thruway brand from Union Station using dedicated bus bays at the north side of the station.

Connections to San Joaquins trains are provided through bus route 1 that travel to and from the Bakersfield Amtrak Station. Direct rail service to Bakersfield is not possible because passenger trains are not normally allowed on the Tehachapi Loop near Bakersfield. When trains are not running during the overnight hours several bus routes provide service along the Pacific Surfliner route (to Santa Barbara, San Diego and select intermediate stations) and the San Joaquin route (to Fresno and select intermediate stations.):

 Route 1: Bakersfield – Los Angeles – Santa Ana – San Diego
 Route 4: Santa Barbara – Los Angeles

Flixbus
While it does not stop on the Union Station property, Flixbus provides intercity service to destinations across the Western United States from a parking lot across the street from the station on the northwest corner of Cesar Chavez Avenue and Vignes Street.

Greyhound 
Greyhound Lines operates its main Los Angeles station from the Patsaouras Transit Plaza. The station opened on October 19, 2022, replacing a station located at 7th and Alameda in the Arts District.

Metro and municipal buses
Bus services using the Patsaouras Transit Plaza:
Antelope Valley Transit Authority: 785*
City of Commerce Municipal Bus Lines: Citadel Outlets Express
City of Santa Clarita Transit: 794*
LAX FlyAway
LADOT Commuter Express: Bunker Hill Shuttle*, *, *, *, *
LADOT DASH: D
Mount St. Mary's College Shuttle*
University of Southern California Shuttles: UPC, HSC, ICS

Bus services using the Union Station Patsaouras Bus Plaza Station, which is located in the median of the El Monte Busway next to US-101:
Los Angeles Metro Busway: J Line
Los Angeles Metro Bus: Express , Express *
Foothill Transit: Silver Streak, *, *, *, *, *, *, *

Bus services using the bus stop on Cesar Chavez Avenue & Vignes Street (northeast corner of station):
LADOT DASH: Lincoln Heights/Chinatown

Bus services using the bus stop on Alameda Street & Los Angeles Street (outside western entrance):
Big Blue Bus: Rapid 10*
LADOT DASH: B
Torrance Transit: 4X*

Bus service using the bus stop on the west side of Union Station (near the taxi stand and the Mozaic Apartments):
Dodger Stadium Express 

* Indicates commuter service that operates only during weekday rush hours.

Platforms and tracks

Future expansion

Link Union Station

With the number of trains using Union Station expanding, the stub-end layout of trackage is limiting the station's capacity. Trains can only enter or exit from the north side of the station. The configuration forces trains without cab-cars to slowly reverse in or out of the station and trains heading to or from the south to make a near-180 degree turn. Compounding the problem, is that while the station has 14 boarding tracks, multiple trains must squeeze onto just 5 tracks.

Originally, there were more tracks at "the throat", but Metrolink had some removed to allow for faster speeds along the curves in and out of the station to improve efficiency as they enter or exit the station. This choke-point can delay arriving trains as they are forced to wait outside of the station to allow a departing train to exit the station. Departures are usually given priority, to free up platforms and to keep them from experiencing delays along their route.

Therefore, Metro has proposed the Link Union Station (Link US, formerly named  Southern California Regional Interconnector) Project, which would extend tracks 3–10 as run-through tracks, which will exit Union Station and cross over the El Monte Busway and US Route 101/Santa Ana Fwy on a long, elevated "S-curve" that will tie into the existing tracks along the Los Angeles River. The plan also includes tracks along the river that would create a "loop" around the station allowing all trains (including those to/from the north or west) to use the run-though tracks.

Metro authorized preliminary engineering for the project in July 2012. A Request For Proposals (RFP) for Link Union Station was being prepared as of June 2013. The $31-million contract for the engineering work on the project was approved on April 24, 2014. The project's estimated value is $350 million. A draft environmental impact report on Link Union Station is expected in 2017

During construction, several tracks may be taken out of service due to their extension. To make up for the temporary loss of those platforms, track 13 was revitalized for use and tracks 14 & 15 were re-constructed. The project was completed on October 17, 2012. Once the Link US project is finished, the run-through tracks and tracks 13–14 will be in regular use (track 15 will be used for storage), resulting in a 40% increase in track capacity.

On July 27, 2019, the Metro board officially approved and certified the Final Environmental Impact Report (FEIR) for the Link US Union Station run-through tracks project. The FIER has an expanded central concourse hallway to replace the new elevated concourse proposed in the Draft EIR, and also eliminated the loop tracks. These modifications reduced project costs while prioritizing rider convenience while transferring between trains. A funding plan for the project was approved on April 21, 2020, with the project's completion targeted for 2026.

In 2021, this project began construction, causing partial closure of platforms at this station.

Former Run-Through Tracks Project
California Department of Transportation (Caltrans) and the Federal Railroad Administration previously drafted a plan to create run-through tracks at Union Station, but the project involved just four tracks and lacked the station "loop" limiting usage of the tracks just to trains heading to or from the south.

The final environmental impact report for the "Los Angeles Union Station Run-Through Tracks Project" was published by the FRA in November 2005.

California High-Speed Rail 
Union Station is planned to be a major hub for the future California High-Speed Rail System. Upon completion, it is projected that passengers will be able to get from Union Station to the Transbay Transit Center in the city of San Francisco in 2 hours and 40 minutes.

As a part of its Master Plan, Metro studied how to best integrate tracks and platforms for high-speed trains arrival into Union Station. Options included an aerial structure above the existing platforms, an underground structure under Alameda Street, an underground structure under Vignes Street and an aerial structure east of Vignes. All plans include a new concourse for high-speed rail passengers and three platforms with six tracks.

Since that time, the Link US project has resulted in changes to how High-Speed Rail (HSR) will be brought into Union Station. That project's Final Environmental Report (FEIR) released in June 2019 indicates that HSR will approach the station from the north, on tracks 3 thru 6, use rebuilt station platforms 2 and 3, then exit to the south onto a new viaduct over the El Monte Busway and Santa Ana Freeway, which curves east (over a rebuilt and relocated Commercial Street) to return to the existing rail corridor along the west bank of the Los Angeles River. Thus, only four tracks and two platforms at Union Station will be used for HSR, with the remaining six tracks being converted to thru status and using the new viaduct to be shared by Metrolink and Amtrak lines. Tracks 13 thru 15 will remain stubs, ending at the south side of the station.

West Santa Ana Branch Transit Corridor

Metro selected Union Station as the eventual northern terminus of the planned West Santa Ana Branch Transit Corridor in 2022. The new light rail line will serve new platforms either at the Forecourt or behind the Metropolitan Water District Building and may open as early as 2043.

In popular culture 
The facility served as a backdrop for the 1950 film Union Station, which starred William Holden and Nancy Olson. It has since been used in numerous films as a filming location, including:

 Blade Runner
 Dead Men Don't Wear Plaid
 Drag Me to Hell
 Gable and Lombard
 Bugsy
 Nick of Time
 Pearl Harbor
 Chandler
 In the Mood
 Private Eye (1987 TV movie starring Josh Brolin)
 Silver Streak
 The Way We Were
Trancers II: The Return of Jack Deth
 Under the Rainbow
 To Live and Die in L.A.
 Muppets Most Wanted
 The Island
 The Italian Job
 Cry Danger
 Union Station
 Garfield: The Movie
 The Dark Knight Rises

Union Station has been featured in numerous television shows, such as Adam-12, 24, Agents of S.H.I.E.L.D., and Euphoria.

It has also been featured in video games; Union Station, as it was in the late 1940s, appears in L.A. Noire, while a smaller fictionalized version of the station appears in Grand Theft Auto: San Andreas as Unity Station.

Union Station was featured in Visiting... with Huell Howser Episode 222.

The music videos of "Drops of Jupiter" by American band Train, directed by Nigel Dick; and "Last Train Home" by John Mayer, directed by Cameron Duddy; were filmed in Union Station. A significant portion of the music video for "Vermilion" by the band Slipknot was filmed within Union Station.

See also 
 List of Registered Historic Places in Los Angeles
 Los Angeles County Metro Rail
 Los Angeles County Metropolitan Transportation Authority
 Los Angeles Metro Rail rolling stock
 Martin F. Betkouski, City Council member accused of profiting from land transactions in the area before Union Station was built

References

Notes

Further reading 
 Musicant, Marlyn, ed., with Deverell, William and Roth, Matthew W. Los Angeles Union Station (Los Angeles): Getty, 2014. xvi, pp. 109; heavily illustrated.

External links 

 

 Union Station overview (LA Metro)
 Map of connections in the Union Station area (LA Metro)
 Map of bus services from Union Station (LA Metro) 
 Los Angeles station information (Amtrak Texas Eagle) 
 Public Art Works at the Union Station and in El Pueblo
 "Union Station" Visiting... with Huell Howser (Episode 222 – September 26, 1994)

Buildings and structures in Downtown Los Angeles
Railway stations in Los Angeles
Transit centers in the United States
Public transportation in Los Angeles
Los Angeles
Metrolink stations in Los Angeles County, California
Los Angeles Metro Busway stations
L Line (Los Angeles Metro) stations
D Line (Los Angeles Metro) stations
B Line (Los Angeles Metro) stations
J Line (Los Angeles Metro)
Los Angeles
Los Angeles
Los Angeles
Los Angeles
Railway stations on the National Register of Historic Places in Los Angeles
Railway stations in the United States opened in 1939
History of Los Angeles
Los Angeles Historic-Cultural Monuments
Clock towers in California
Towers in California
John and Donald Parkinson buildings
Art Deco architecture in California
Art Deco railway stations
Spanish Colonial Revival architecture in California
Mission Revival architecture in California
Streamline Moderne architecture in California
Amtrak Thruway Motorcoach stations in Los Angeles County, California
Bus stations in Los Angeles
1939 establishments in California
Proposed California High-Speed Rail stations